The James Monroe Avent House in Hickory Valley, Tennessee was listed on the National Register of Historic Places in 2001.

It is a two-and-a-half-story wood-frame Queen Anne-style house on a brick foundation.  It was deemed significant as a Queen Anne house and for its association with James Monroe Avent (1860-1936), the "Fox of Hickory Valley," a dog trainer who developed the  National Bird Dog Championship during the years he lived in this house.

At the time of NRHP listing in 2001, the house was operated as a bed and breakfast.

References

National Register of Historic Places in Tennessee
Queen Anne architecture in Tennessee
Hardeman County, Tennessee